Amanda Victoria Vilanova Pérez (born December 30, 1991) is a Puerto Rican TV Host, model and beauty pageant titleholder who was crowned Miss World Puerto Rico 2011 and represented Puerto Rico at Miss World 2011 and placed 2nd runner-up.

Pageant participations

Miss Latin America 2010
In 2010 she placed 1st Runner-Up in Miss Latin America 2010, in Punta Cana, Dominican Republic.

Miss Mundo de Puerto Rico 2011
The Miss World Puerto Rico 2011 pageant was held at the Alejandro Tapia y Rivera Theater, Old San Juan, Puerto Rico, on June 9, 2011, where Vilanova, representing San Juan, won the title.

Miss World 2011
Amanda Vilanova represented Puerto Rico at the 61st Miss World 2011 pageant, which was held at London, England, UK on November 6, 2011. She finished as 2nd Runner-Up (2nd Princess) to Ivian Sarcos of Venezuela.

Theater appearances
Vilanova has had experience in various plays as an actress. In 2010 she started acting in the theater during the play Private Lives, directed by José Juan.

In April 2011 she played the role of Sister James in a Spanish translation of John Patrick Shanley's Doubt: A Parable. The play was presented on the Teatro theater in the University of Puerto Rico, Río Piedras Campus.

References

Living people
People from San Juan, Puerto Rico
Puerto Rican beauty pageant winners
Miss World 2011 delegates
1991 births